It Don't Bother Me is the second album by Scottish folk musician Bert Jansch, released in November 1965. The album was produced by Nathan Joseph and Bill Leader, although Leader was left uncredited.

The album features nine songs and two instrumentals composed by Jansch, as well as one by Alex Campbell ("So Long [Been on the Road So Long]"), and the traditional "900 Miles". For this last track, Jansch accompanies himself on the banjo rather than the steel-string acoustic guitar which he uses elsewhere. "My Lover" has Roy Harper playing some additional guitar, while John Renbourn is playing the lead acoustic guitar part. "Lucky Thirteen" is a guitar duet with Renbourn, based on a song written by the latter and apparently recorded during the Bert and John session.

Track listing
All tracks composed by Bert Jansch, except where indicated

References
 Sleeve notes to Bert Jansch, it don’t bother me (TRA 132).

Bert Jansch albums
1965 albums
Transatlantic Records albums
Albums produced by Nathan Joseph
Albums produced by Bill Leader